The Gosan Seowon is a seowon located in the village of Gwangeum-ri, Namhu-myeon of Andong, North Gyeongsang Province, South Korea. Seowon is a type of local academy during the Joseon Dynasty (1392–1897). It was first established  by local Confucian scholars in 1789, the 13th year of King Jeongjo's reign, to commemorate the scholarly achievement and virtue of the Confucian scholar Yi Sang-jeong (李象靖 1711-1781).

See also
Dosan Seowon
Byeongsan Seowon
Imcheon Seowon
Korean Confucianism
List of seowon

References

External links
 안동 고산서원과 숙박 체험 at Newscan

Seowon
Andong
Educational institutions established in 1789
18th-century establishments in Korea
1789 establishments in Asia
Buildings and structures in North Gyeongsang Province